Uranium tetrachloride is an inorganic compound, a salt of uranium and chlorine, with the formula UCl4.  It is a hygroscopic olive-green solid. It was used in the electromagnetic isotope separation (EMIS) process of uranium enrichment.  It is one of the main starting materials for organouranium chemistry.

Synthesis and structure 

Uranium tetrachloride is synthesised generally by the reaction of uranium trioxide (UO3) and hexachloropropene.  Solvent UCl4 adducts can be formed by a simpler reaction of UI4 with hydrogen chloride in organic solvents.

According to X-ray crystallography the uranium centers are eight-coordinate, being surrounded by eight chlorine atoms, four at 264 pm and the other four at 287pm.

Chemical properties 
Dissolution in protic solvents is more complicated. When UCl4 is added to water the uranium aqua ion is formed.
UCl4 + H2O → [U(H2O)]4+ + 4Cl−
The aqua ion [U(H2O)]4+, (x is 8 or 9) is strongly hydrolyzed. 
[U(H2O)]4+  [U(H2O)(OH)]3+ + H+
The pKa for this reaction is ca. 1.6, so hydrolysis is absent only in solutions of acid strength 1 mol dm−3 or stronger (pH < 0). Further hydrolysis occurs at pH > 3. Weak chloro complexes of the aqua ion may be formed. Published estimates of the log K value for the formation of [UCl]3+(aq) vary from −0.5 to +3 because of difficulty in dealing with simultaneous hydrolysis.

With alcohols, partial solvolysis may occur.
UCl4 + ROH  UCl(OR) + HCl

Uranium tetrachloride dissolves in non-protic solvents such as tetrahydrofuran, acetonitrile, dimethyl formamide etc. that can act as Lewis bases. Solvates of formula UCl4L are formed which may be isolated. The solvent must be completely free of dissolved water, or hydrolysis will occur, with the solvent, S, picking up the released proton.
UCl4 + H2O + S  UCl3(OH) + SH+ +Cl−
The solvent molecules may be replaced by other ligand in a reaction such as 
UCl4 + 2Cl− → [UCl6]2−.
The solvent is not shown, just as when complexes of other metal ions are formed in aqueous solution.

Solutions of UCl4 are susceptible to oxidation by air, resulting in the production of complexes of the uranyl ion.

Applications 
Uranium tetrachloride is produced commercially by the reaction of carbon tetrachloride with pure uranium dioxide UO2 at 370 °C. It has been used as feed in the electromagnetic isotope separation (EMIS) process of uranium enrichment. Beginning in 1944, the Oak Ridge Y-12 Plant converted UO3 to UCl4 feed for the Ernest O. Lawrence's Alpha Calutrons. Its major benefit being the uranium tetrachloride used in the calutrons is not as corrosive as the uranium hexafluoride used in most other enrichment technologies This process was abandoned in the 1950s. In the 1980s, however, Iraq unexpectedly revived this option as part of its nuclear weapons program. In the enrichment process, uranium tetrachloride is ionized into a uranium plasma.

The uranium ions are then accelerated and passed through a strong magnetic field. After traveling along half of a circle, the beam is split into a region nearer the outside wall, which is depleted, and a region nearer the inside wall, which is enriched in 235U. The large amounts of energy required in maintaining the strong magnetic fields as well as the low recovery rates of the uranium feed material and slower more inconvenient facility operation make this an unlikely choice for large scale enrichment plants.

Work is being done in the use of molten uranium chloride–alkali chloride mixtures as reactor fuels in molten salt reactors. Uranium tetrachloride melts dissolved in a lithium chloride–potassium chloride eutectic have also been explored as a means to recover actinides from irradiated nuclear fuels through pyrochemical nuclear reprocessing.

Safety 
Like all water soluble uranium salts, uranium tetrachloride is nephrotoxic (poisonous to the kidney) and can cause severe renal damage and acute renal failure if ingested.

References 

Uranium(IV) compounds
Chlorides
Actinide halides
Nuclear materials